Robert Kay is a British actor whose credits include Fugitive Pieces, Heroes Reborn, Pinocchio, Pirates of the Caribbean: On Stranger Tides, and Peter Pan in the Once Upon a Time television series.

Career
Kay's family moved to the Czech Republic, where he saw a note for English-speaking children to be extras in a film on a school noticeboard. Despite a lack of previous acting experience, this led to him getting a speaking part in The Illusionist, but his scenes were eventually cut from the film.

After small roles in Hannibal Rising and My Boy Jack, the Canadian production company making Fugitive Pieces asked him to play the part of young Jakob, which involved a 9-week shooting schedule, three of which were on Greek islands.

The people who made Fugitive Pieces had auditioned more than 150 boys before finding 10-year-old Robbie, who had been living in Prague for two years. He spent a year studying acting, singing, and dancing at one of Britain's Stagecoach theatre schools. Kay appeared in the 2008 miniseries Pinocchio, playing the title character. After finishing Pinocchio, he went on to play Sam, a boy diagnosed with leukemia in Ways To Live Forever screening in late 2010. He appeared in Pirates of the Caribbean: On Stranger Tides, playing the Cabin Boy. More recently, he portrayed Peter Pan in Once Upon a Time.

In March 2015, Kay was cast as a high school student named Tommy Clark in the TV series Heroes Reborn.

Reception
Kay's work has been generally well received by the critics. Alicia Cox of Chatelaine wrote on his work in Fugitive Pieces: "Robbie Kay, who plays the young Jakob, gives a remarkable performance with little words and a lot of emotion. When he smiles (which isn't often) you can't help but be affected."

Personal life
Kay was born in Lymington, Hampshire, England, to Ivan and Stephanie Kay. He moved to Brussels, Belgium, at an early age. He has two older sisters, Camilla and Fiona.

In 2006, Kay and his family moved to Prague in the Czech Republic, where he attended the International School of Prague. He has been living in Houston, Texas, since 2011.

Select filmography

Film

Television

Awards and nominations

References

External links

Robbie Kay at Flixster
 Ways to live forever- The movie

Year of birth missing (living people)
21st-century English male actors
English male child actors
English male film actors
English male television actors
Living people
English expatriates in the United States
People from Lymington
Male actors from Hampshire